Kaoreanbu Dam is a gravity dam located in Gifu Prefecture in Japan. The dam is used for power production. The catchment area of the dam is 2.5 km2. The dam impounds about 39  ha of land when full and can store 17200 thousand cubic meters of water. The construction of the dam was started on 1976 and completed in 1995.

References

Dams in Gifu Prefecture
1995 establishments in Japan